This is a list of episodes for Rovio Entertainment's animated series Angry Birds Stella.

Series overview

Episodes

Season 1 (2014–15)

Season 2 (2015–16)
Note: This season takes place after the events of the first season's last episode. It is turned out that Gale survived the incident.

Home media
Sony Pictures Home Entertainment is the DVD distributor for the series.
 Angry Birds Stella: The Complete 1st Season (December 1, 2015)
 Angry Birds Stella: The Complete 2nd Season (March 1, 2016)

References

Angry Birds Stella
Angry Birds